Physalaemus barrioi is a species of frog in the family Leptodactylidae. It is endemic to Serra do Bocaina in São Paulo state, Brazil. The specific name barrioi honors , a Spanish botanist and zoologist who lived in Argentina. However, the common name Bocaina dwarf frog has been proposed for it.

Description
Adult males measure  in snout–vent length. The head is triangular and longer than it is wide. The snout is sub-elliptical in dorsal view and acuminate laterally. The tympanum is concealed and the supratympanic fold is weakly developed. The fingers and the toes lack fringes and webbing. Coloration is dorsally brown or green, with some patterning that helps to camouflage the animal. A dark stripe runs from the canthus rostralis to the middle of the flank.

The male advertisement call consists of a single, modulated, non-pulsed note lasting about 1.2 seconds. The calls are emitted at a rate of about 8 calls per minute.

Tadpoles have an ovoid body when viewed dorsally and globular when viewed laterally. The body is dark brown and has two dark stripes that continue onto the tail.

Habitat and conservation
Males call at night from bases of small thickets in open marsh areas. Foam nests are anchored at the base of marginal vegetation, typically grasses. Tadpoles can be found in permanent shallow marshes and small ponds with clay bottoms.

Physalaemus barrioi occurs within and near the Serra da Bocaina National Park. The species may be negatively affected by reforestation as it is current more commonly found in open montane grasslands.

References

barrioi
Amphibians of Brazil
Endemic fauna of Brazil
Amphibians described in 1967
Taxonomy articles created by Polbot